St. Thomas Aquinas Secondary School may refer to:

In Canada:
St. Thomas Aquinas Secondary School (Brampton), Ontario
St. Thomas Aquinas Catholic Secondary School (Lindsay), Ontario
St. Thomas Aquinas Catholic Secondary School (London, Ontario)
St. Thomas Aquinas Catholic Secondary School (Oakville), Ontario
St. Thomas Aquinas Catholic Secondary School (Tottenham), Ontario

In England:
St. Thomas Aquinas Catholic School, Birmingham

In Ghana:
St. Thomas Aquinas Senior High School

In Scotland:
St. Thomas Aquinas Secondary School, Glasgow

See also
 St. Thomas Aquinas High School (disambiguation)